Chula is an island that is a part of the Bajuni Islands archepelago in southern Somalia in the Somali Sea. It is the most populated of the six islands.

See also
Jasiirada Khuuri

References

Islands of Somalia
Islands of the Indian Ocean
Somali Sea